Ronald Peter 'Percy' Freeman (4 July 1945 – 5 January 2016) was an English footballer who played as a forward.

Early career
Freeman commenced his career with local non-league clubs around Redditch where he was brought up, playing for junior sides Headless Cross Youth, Alcester Boys Club and Clent Rovers as a teenager and then senior sides Alcester Town, Alvechurch, Astwood Bank, and Stourbridge coupled with Sunday league teams AFC, Black Horse and the Redditch Wednesday shopkeepers team. He joined West Bromwich Albion in 1969. After only making three appearances with The Hawthorns club, Freeman signed for Lincoln City where he was best known with 152 league appearances and 64 goals. Freeman also played for Reading and Boston United, and later managed Boston Town.

Freeman died on 5 January 2016 at the age of 70 after a long period of ill-health.

References

1945 births
2016 deaths
English footballers
Alcester Town F.C. players
Alvechurch F.C. players
Stourbridge F.C. players
West Bromwich Albion F.C. players
Lincoln City F.C. players
Reading F.C. players
Boston United F.C. players
English football managers
Boston Town F.C. managers
Sportspeople from Newark-on-Trent
Footballers from Nottinghamshire
Association football forwards